Hans Besser (1510-after 1558) was a German Renaissance portrait painter. His exact date of death is not known.

Not much is known about Besser's life except through his works. He was probably born in Aachen, Cologne and left in 1537 because of religious persecution, and found refuge in the Electoral Palatinate. He became a citizen of the city of Speyer. In 1546 he was appointed official court painter for Frederick II, Elector Palatine. After the death of Frederick in 1556, Besser continued as court painter to Otto Henry, Elector Palatine.

Besser was primarily a portrait painter. Before these portraits were detectable through documentation, attributions of his works were originally assigned to either Master of Pfalz or Master of Margrave. These names were given to the painter because of the frequent representation of the Palatinate princes. Besser demonstrated none of the leading visual style of the Renaissance in Germany. His cool portraits with their motionless poses and rigid facial expressions show a distant contemplation, which seems to follow a sober objectivity of Dutch painting of the period of the Reformation.

References
 K. holes: Hans Better - The Master of Pfalz- and Margrave. (With a contribution by Barbara Schock-Werner.) In: Munich Yearbook of Fine Arts, the third episode, 47 (1996), pp 73–102
 Hans Besser. In: Art Encyclopedia. The Concise Grove Dictionary of Art, Oxford University Press Online Edition 2002 called, April 2010
 Holes, Kurt: Hans Besser. In: Saur. General Artist Encyclopedia, Vol. 10, Munich / Leipzig 1995, p 208–209.
 Baden State Museum Karlsruhe: The Renaissance in the southwest of Germany between the Reformation and the Thirty Years' War. Catalog. Bd. 1 Karlsruhe 1986

1510 births
Year of death unknown
16th-century German painters
German male painters
German Renaissance painters
People from Aachen